Badamia exclamationis, commonly known as the brown awl or narrow-winged awl, is a butterfly belonging to the family Hesperiidae. It is found in south and southeast Asia, Australia, and Oceania.

Range 

The brown awl is found in Sri Lanka, India, Myanmar, Cambodia, South Yunnan, Australia and Japan. This butterfly is found throughout the Indian subcontinent and in the Andaman islands. The type locality is South India.

Status 

As per William Harry Evans (1932), the butterfly is common in India and rare in the Andaman islands. Mark Alexander Wynter-Blyth (1957) records it as "Not Rare" and "Locally Common". Krushnamegh Kunte (2000) reports it as common in deciduous forests during the monsoon months and the evergreen forests in the following months.

Habits 

A forest butterfly, the brown awl favours openings and edges of deciduous and evergreen forests while its caterpillars are to be found in moist deciduous and semi-evergreen forests. It flies about either late or early in the morning in the shade of the jungles. It can be sometimes seen in bright sunlight visiting flowers, such as Glycosmis, Buddleia, Chromolaena and Lantana, but is very wary and energetic at such times, moving jerkily and rapidly between flowers or across inflorescences. It can also be seen mud-puddling or at bird droppings.

During a population explosion, like those of the common banded awl (Hasora chromus), the caterpillars of the brown awl may strip away all their food supply forcing the butterflies to migrate to other places where a fresh supply of host plants is available and even to other habitats such as shrubs, grasslands and gardens.

The brown awl flies as low as 6 feet over the bushes or as high as 60 to 75 feet in the canopy. The adults feed at lower levels on flowers of shrubs and small trees, but ascend to higher reaches of the vegetation to lay eggs or to bask, which it does very occasionally, holding its wings flat with the forewings covering the hindwings thus giving an arrowhead effect. The flight of the butterfly is fast and bounding with an audible wing beat.

When inactive, it rests on the undersides of leaves in shady forest spots, with the head pointing downwards. If disturbed it will generally buzz around energetically before returning to the same spot to rest.

Description 

The brown awl is a non-descript brown butterfly, darker above and lighter below. The sexes are alike, except for three to four semi-transparent spots on the forewing which cannot be differentiated in the field. The skipper has a light-brown abdomen with black bands across it. The dry-season form is usually smaller, paler, and may not have the forewing spots.

This skipper is unmistakable because of its long and narrow wings. It has the longest wings in proportion to breadth of all Indian butterflies.

Detailed description 

Edward Yerbury Watson (1891) gives a detailed description:

Genus characters

Species description

Similar species 

Unlike the other awls, the brown awl lacks the narrow white wing bands on the hindwings. The very distinctive characteristics of the brown awl are the characteristic shape of the body and the narrower wings than the other awls.

Life cycle

Eggs 

The brown awl lays many eggs on a single plant, one at a time, on the tips of fresh shoots. The dome-shaped egg is pale green with longitudinal ridges having fine beadings; a total 13 ridges in all.

Larva 

The larva is a pale violaceous (violet) yellow, with numerous black transverse dorsal lines; the prolegs are whitish encircled with black. The head is yellow, approximately heart shaped, with a black band and many tiny black spots.

On hatching the larva webs the edges of leaves together with silk to form a roomy cell from a leaf in which it resides throughout the larval stage. When disturbed, it can move quite briskly and even drop off. The caterpillars of the brown awl grow faster than most of those of other families, and have moist, sticky droppings.

At the time of pupation they descend close to the ground, looking for suitable spots to pupate. The caterpillar constructs a tubular cell from a leaf by drawing the edges together with thick strands of silk. In this cell, the caterpillar prepares an extensive silk bed on which it sits awaiting pupation. The freshly formed pupa clings onto the silken pad almost immediately.

Pupa 

The pupa is stubby, with protruding eyes and a prominent projection on the head in between them. The pupa may be light brown or violaceous. The body tapers away from the shoulders towards the rear. The abdomen is creamish with a row of four black spots on each side. The pupa is shiny, but plastered with a white powder.

Host plants 

The caterpillars have been recorded on the following deciduous and semi-evergreen forest plants, mostly from the family Combretaceae:

 Large climbing shrubs of Combretum such as Combretum albidum, Combretum latifolium and Combretum ovalifolium.
 Large forest trees of genus Terminalia such as Terminalia bellerica, Terminalia catappa and Terminalia oblongata.
 Anogeissus acuminata and  Chionanthus purpureus.
 Hiptage benghalensis (Malpighiaceae)
 Linociera purpurea.
 Ficus spp.

Gallery

See also 
 Coeliadinae
 List of butterflies of India (Coeliadinae)
 List of butterflies of India (Hesperiidae)

References

Bibliography 

 
 Brower, Andrew V. Z. and Warren, Andrew, (2007). Coeliadinae Evans 1937. Version 21 February 2007 (temporary). http://tolweb.org/Coeliadinae/12150/2007.02.21 in The Tree of Life Web Project, http://tolweb.org/
 
 
 
 Watson, E. Y. (1891) Hesperiidae indicae. Vest and Co. Madras.

External links
Images representing Badamia exclamationis at Consortium for the Barcode of Life

Coeliadinae
Butterflies of Asia
Butterflies of Oceania
Butterflies of Indochina
Butterflies of Malaysia
Butterflies of Singapore
Butterflies described in 1775
Taxa named by Johan Christian Fabricius